Itaporã Futebol Clube, commonly known as Itaporã, is a Brazilian football team based in Itaporã, Mato Grosso do Sul.

History
The club was founded on March 5, 2008. Itaporã won the Campeonato Sul-Mato-Grossense Third Level in 2008, being promoted in the same season to the Campeonato Sul-Mato-Grossense Third Level, winning that competition as well.

Achievements

 Campeonato Sul-Mato-Grossense Série B:
 Winners (2): 2008, 2015
 Campeonato Sul-Mato-Grossense Série C:
 Winners (1): 2008

Stadium
Itaporã Futebol Clube play their home games at Estádio Francisco Chaves Filho, nicknamed Chavinha. The stadium has a maximum capacity of 5,000 people.

References

Association football clubs established in 2008
Football clubs in Mato Grosso do Sul
2008 establishments in Brazil